The Nikolai Vatutin monument was a sculpture monument to Nikolai Vatutin, erected in 1948 and located in Mariinskyi Park, Kyiv, Ukraine, that was dismantled on 9 February 2023.

History
Nikolai Vatutin was a Soviet military commander during World War II who was responsible for many Red Army operations in Ukraine including the retaking of Kiev (Kyiv) by the Red Army in 1943. On 28 February 1944 Vatutin was ambushed by Ukrainian Insurgent Army (UPA) insurgents far behind the front lines near the village of Mylyatyn in Ostroh Raion (Rivne Oblast). He succumbed to sepsis, caused by the injuries, in a hospital at Kiev on 15 April 1944.

Vatutin was buried in front of a statue depicting him near the Ukrainian Parliament in Kyiv's Mariinskyi Park. The monument was erected in 1948. It was designed by prominent Soviet sculptor Yevgeny Vuchetich. On the pedestal of the monument was written "General Vatutin from the Ukrainian people."

In 2010 the Kyiv City State Administration gave the monument the status of cultural heritage site.

In 2015, Vatutin's daughter Elena announced that her father had been buried in Kiev (now called Kyiv) by Nikita Khrushchev against her family's wishes and that his surviving family lived in Russia and in the Czech Republic and would attempt to obtain permission to rebury him in Moscow. The primary reason was stated to be the family's dislike for the new Ukrainian government's association with Stepan Bandera, whose Ukrainian Insurgent Army followers had killed Vatutin. Originally, a press release from Just Russia had falsely claimed that the initiative to move his body had come from the Kyiv City State Administration. The reburial failed to materialize, and Vatutin's grave and monument remained in their place.

In 2015 the Ukrainian Institute of National Remembrance included Vatutin to the list of "persons involved in the fight against the independence of Ukraine and political repression." After the adoption of the Ukrainian decommunization laws also in 2015 Vatutin was not included on the list of "persons subject to decommunization."

Elena Vatutin died in 2016.

On 8 February 2023 the Ministry of Culture and Information Policy revoked the monument to Vatutin in Mariinskyi Park of its (Ukrainian) cultural heritage site status. On 27 January 2023 the ministry had recommended the Kyiv City State Administration to dismantle and move the monument, it proposed to rebuild the monument in the National Museum-Preserve "Battle for Kyiv 1943".

The Kyiv City State Administration announced on 8 February 2023 that the Vatutin monument would be dismantled the following day. The monument was dismantled on 9 February.

Gallery

See also
Demolition of monuments to Vladimir Lenin in Ukraine
Demolition of monuments to Alexander Pushkin in Ukraine

Notes

References

Demolished buildings and structures in Kyiv
History of Kyiv
Monuments and memorials in Kyiv
Statues in Ukraine
Destroyed sculptures
1948 sculptures
Russians in Ukraine
Sculptures in the Soviet Union
Buildings and structures demolished in 2023
Vandalized works of art in Ukraine
Decommunization in Ukraine
Outdoor sculptures in Ukraine
1948 establishments in Ukraine
2023 disestablishments in Ukraine
Sculptures of men in Ukraine
Vatutin, Nikolai in Kyiv
Statues removed in 2023
Burials at Mariinsky Park